Rogério Lobo (January 26, 1971 – July 28, 2006) was a professional boxer.

Boxing career
Born in São Paulo, Brazil, Lobo turned professional in 1995 and was known as a journeyman fighter in Brazil before getting a couple of main event fights in the United States and even Italy and Fiji. Although he never defeated a notable foe, he suffered losses to contenders Vincenzo Cantatore, Owen Beck, Jean François Bergeron, Timor Ibragimov, Mike Mollo and Kali Meehan. His final fight was a KO win via a right hook in late 2006.

Death
Lobo was killed just two days after his last fight, during an armed robbery in a restaurant he owned in Sao Paulo. Lobo bought the establishment with the money he received after his two fights in Las Vegas in 2003. Rogério was shot multiple times in the chest and arms by assailants. He died hours later after going into cardiac arrest at a local hospital in Sao Paulo. He left behind his wife Ana Lobo and an 18-month-old son. After his death, the promotion he last fought for in his native Brazil held a memorial event in his memory and to raise money for his wife and son.

Professional boxing record

|-
|align="center" colspan=8|40 Wins (34 knockouts, 6 decisions), 17 Losses (13 knockouts, 4 decisions) 
|-
| align="center" style="border-style: none none solid solid; background: #e3e3e3"|Result
| align="center" style="border-style: none none solid solid; background: #e3e3e3"|Record
| align="center" style="border-style: none none solid solid; background: #e3e3e3"|Opponent
| align="center" style="border-style: none none solid solid; background: #e3e3e3"|Type
| align="center" style="border-style: none none solid solid; background: #e3e3e3"|Round
| align="center" style="border-style: none none solid solid; background: #e3e3e3"|Date
| align="center" style="border-style: none none solid solid; background: #e3e3e3"|Location
| align="center" style="border-style: none none solid solid; background: #e3e3e3"|Notes
|-align=center
|Win
|
|align=left| Adilson Noli
|KO
|1
|26/07/2006
|align=left| Sao Paulo, Brazil
|align=left|
|-
|Loss
|
|align=left| David Cadieux
|RTD
|4
|23/06/2006
|align=left| Montreal, Quebec, Canada
|align=left|
|-
|Win
|
|align=left| Richard Da Gloria
|TKO
|3
|30/05/2006
|align=left| Sao Paulo, Brazil
|align=left|
|-
|Loss
|
|align=left| Kali Meehan
|KO
|3
|31/03/2006
|align=left| Suva, Fiji
|align=left|
|-
|Win
|
|align=left| Ruy Da Gloria
|KO
|2
|23/02/2006
|align=left| Sao Paulo, Brazil
|align=left|
|-
|Loss
|
|align=left| Richel "The Dutch Sonny Liston" Hersisia
|UD
|6
|14/01/2006
|align=left| Aschersleben, Sachsen-Anhalt, Germany
|align=left|
|-
|Win
|
|align=left| Marival Sobral Sobrinho
|DQ
|2
|10/12/2005
|align=left| Sao Paulo, Brazil
|align=left|
|-
|Loss
|
|align=left| Mike Mollo
|KO
|6
|04/11/2005
|align=left| Cicero, Illinois, United States
|align=left|
|-
|Win
|
|align=left| Albertino Mota Pinheiro
|RTD
|2
|01/10/2005
|align=left| Sao Paulo, Brazil
|align=left|
|-
|Win
|
|align=left| Jose Carlos Da Silva
|TKO
|3
|18/09/2005
|align=left| Sao Paulo, Brazil
|align=left|
|-
|Loss
|
|align=left| Timur Ibragimov
|KO
|4
|24/06/2005
|align=left| Las Vegas, Nevada, United States
|align=left|
|-
|Win
|
|align=left| Aurelio Dos Santos
|KO
|1
|12/06/2005
|align=left| Sao Paulo, Brazil
|align=left|
|-
|Loss
|
|align=left| Mauro Adrian "El Atleta" Ordiales
|KO
|2
|19/03/2005
|align=left| Buenos Aires, Argentina
|align=left|
|-
|Loss
|
|align=left| Vincenzo Rossitto
|TKO
|3
|02/10/2004
|align=left| Toscana, Italy
|align=left|
|-
|Win
|
|align=left| Reinaldo Fidelis
|KO
|3
|01/05/2004
|align=left| Sao Paulo, Brazil
|align=left|
|-
|Win
|
|align=left| Luis Americo Kihara
|TKO
|3
|26/04/2004
|align=left| Brazil
|align=left|
|-
|Loss
|
|align=left| Jean Francois Bergeron
|KO
|2
|20/03/2004
|align=left| Montreal, Quebec, Canada
|align=left|
|-
|Loss
|
|align=left| Daniel Bispo
|UD
|10
|24/01/2004
|align=left| Sao Paulo, Brazil
|align=left|
|-
|Win
|
|align=left| Luis Americo Kihara
|TKO
|5
|21/12/2003
|align=left| Sao Paulo, Brazil
|align=left|
|-
|Loss
|
|align=left| Michael "Double M" Moorer
|KO
|1
|23/08/2003
|align=left| Coconut Creek, Florida, United States
|align=left|
|-
|Win
|
|align=left| Richard Da Gloria
|KO
|1
|06/07/2003
|align=left| Sao Paulo, Brazil
|align=left|
|-
|Loss
|
|align=left| Kelvin "Concrete" Davis
|TKO
|1
|21/02/2003
|align=left| Las Vegas, Nevada, United States
|align=left|
|-
|Loss
|
|align=left| Owen Beck
|TKO
|4
|27/07/2002
|align=left| Las Vegas, Nevada, United States
|align=left|
|-
|Win
|
|align=left| Josemir Henrique Fernandes
|KO
|7
|21/04/2002
|align=left| Brasilia, Brazil
|align=left|
|-
|Win
|
|align=left| Richard Da Gloria
|KO
|3
|23/03/2002
|align=left| Sao Paulo, Brazil
|align=left|
|-
|Loss
|
|align=left| Pedro Daniel "Ringo" Franco
|TKO
|5
|14/07/2001
|align=left| Buenos Aires, Argentina
|align=left|
|-
|Win
|
|align=left| Jonatas Dos Santos
|TKO
|4
|30/06/2001
|align=left| Sao Paulo, Brazil
|align=left|
|-
|Win
|
|align=left| Carlos Barcelete
|KO
|3
|18/05/2001
|align=left| Sao Paulo, Brazil
|align=left|
|-
|Win
|
|align=left| Vincenzo Cantatore
|KO
|1
|26/12/2000
|align=left| Rome, Italy
|align=left|
|-
|Win
|
|align=left| Tyrone Armstead
|UD
|6
|22/07/2000
|align=left| Miami, Florida, United States
|align=left|
|-
|Win
|
|align=left| Marcos Reginaldo Dos Santos
|KO
|1
|26/07/2006
|align=left| Sao Paulo, Brazil
|align=left|
|-
|Win
|
|align=left| Eduardo Franca
|KO
|2
|30/05/2000
|align=left| Sao Paulo, Brazil
|align=left|
|-
|Win
|
|align=left| Lourival Luiz "Cowboy" Da Silva
|TKO
|3
|18/04/2000
|align=left| Sao Paulo, Brazil
|align=left|
|-
|Win
|
|align=left| Jose Laercio "Blindado" Bezerra de Lima
|TKO
|4
|22/02/2000
|align=left| Pernambuco, Brazil
|align=left|
|-
|Win
|
|align=left| Eduardo Franca
|KO
|1
|26/08/1999
|align=left| Sao Paulo, Brazil
|align=left|
|-
|Win
|
|align=left| Ronaldo Da Silva Porto
|KO
|1
|17/07/1999
|align=left| Sao Paulo, Brazil
|align=left|
|-
|Win
|
|align=left| Lourival Luiz Da Silva
|TKO
|1
|29/05/1999
|align=left| Sao Paulo, Brazil
|align=left|
|-
|Win
|
|align=left| Marco Antonio Duarte
|TKO
|5
|19/12/1998
|align=left| Punta del Este, Uruguay
|align=left|
|-
|Win
|
|align=left| Raul Noberto Guichapani
|KO
|6
|17/10/1998
|align=left| Punta del Este, Uruguay
|align=left|
|-
|Loss
|
|align=left| Marco Antonio Duarte
|SD
|12
|01/08/1998
|align=left| Punta del Este, Uruguay
|align=left|
|-
|Win
|
|align=left| Silvano De Castro
|TKO
|1
|02/06/1998
|align=left| Sao Paulo, Brazil
|align=left|
|-
|Win
|
|align=left|Nelson Gamarra
|KO
|3
|20/03/1998
|align=left| Sao Paulo, Brazil
|align=left|
|-
|Loss
|
|align=left| Jorge "Locomotora" Castro
|KO
|3
|23/01/1998
|align=left| Buenos Aires, Argentina
|align=left|
|-
|Win
|
|align=left| Clovis Aparecido Barbosa
|KO
|2
|06/07/1997
|align=left| Sao Paulo, Brazil
|align=left|
|-
|Win
|
|align=left| Osmar Luiz "Animal" Teixeira
|KO
|1
|21/06/1997
|align=left| Sao Paulo, Brazil
|align=left|
|-
|Win
|
|align=left| Juan Carlos Scaglia
|PTS
|12
|29/04/1997
|align=left| Sao Paulo, Brazil
|align=left|
|-
|Loss
|
|align=left| Thomas Hansvoll
|PTS
|6
|15/11/1996
|align=left| Naestved, Denmark
|align=left|
|-
|Win
|
|align=left| Carlos "Cano" Betancourt
|KO
|5
|20/07/1996
|align=left| Tampa, Florida, United States
|align=left|
|-
|Win
|
|align=left| Marcos Reginaldo Dos Santos
|KO
|2
|27/04/1996
|align=left| Sao Paulo, Brazil
|align=left|
|-
|Win
|
|align=left| Sergio Lopes Nogueira
|KO
|3
|15/11/1995
|align=left| Goias, Brazil
|align=left|
|-
|Win
|
|align=left| Teobaldo Sergio De Oliveira
|TKO
|4
|18/07/1995
|align=left| Sao Paulo, Brazil
|align=left|
|-
|Win
|
|align=left| Lourival Luiz "Cowboy" Da Silva
|PTS
|8
|20/06/1995
|align=left| Sao Paulo, Brazil
|align=left|
|-
|Win
|
|align=left| Joe Harris
|PTS
|8
|06/06/1995
|align=left| Fortaleza, Brazil
|align=left|
|-
|Win
|
|align=left| Cicero Andrade
|KO
|2
|25/04/1995
|align=left| Sao Paulo, Brazil
|align=left|
|-
|Win
|
|align=left| Edson "Agulha" Farias
|PTS
|6
|04/04/1995
|align=left| Belem, Paraiba, Brazil
|align=left|
|-
|Win
|
|align=left| Genesio Torres
|TKO
|3
|19/03/1995
|align=left| Pernambuco, Brazil
|align=left|
|-
|Win
|
|align=left| Albertino Mota "Mineiro" Pinheiro
|KO
|2
|26/02/1995
|align=left| Sao Paulo, Brazil
|align=left|
|}

External links

References 

1971 births
2006 deaths
Brazilian murder victims
Cruiserweight boxers
Male murder victims
People murdered in Brazil
Deaths by firearm in Brazil
Brazilian practitioners of Brazilian jiu-jitsu
Brazilian male boxers
Sportspeople from São Paulo
20th-century Brazilian people
21st-century Brazilian people